The Minister for Portsmouth was a ministerial role within the Government of the United Kingdom. It was created in January 2014 with the appointment of Michael Fallon as the first Minister for Portsmouth. The post was created in response to the loss of jobs from BAE Systems in the local shipyard. The minister was charged with bringing economic growth to the city.

In the Cabinet reshuffle of 15 July 2014 this role moved to Matthew Hancock, whose full title was Minister of State for Energy, Business and Portsmouth. Following the Conservative Party's success in the 2015 general election, Hancock was succeeded by Mark Francois as Minister for Portsmouth, but Francois was not replaced when he left in the July 2016 reshuffle.

List of Ministers for Portsmouth
Colour key (for political parties):

References

Politics of Portsmouth
Defunct ministerial offices in the United Kingdom
2014 establishments in the United Kingdom
2016 disestablishments in the United Kingdom
Ministries established in 2014